Newtown, is a townland in the Barony of Ormond Upper in County Tipperary, Ireland. It is in the civil parish of Ballymackey	
and is one of nineteen townlands known as Newtown in County Tipperary.

References

Townlands of County Tipperary